Ferindonald or Ferrindonald is a crofting township, located on the east coast of the Sleat peninsula, lying on the A851 road, in the Isle of Skye, Scottish Highlands and is in the Scottish council area of Highland.

References

Populated places in the Isle of Skye